Kowalewo  (German: Kabel) is a village in the administrative district of Gmina Szlichtyngowa, within Wschowa County, Lubusz Voivodeship, in western Poland.

References

Kowalewo